The prime minister of the Portuguese Republic is the head of the Government of Portugal. They coordinate the actions of all ministers, represent the Government as a whole, report their actions and is accountable to the Assembly of the Republic, and keep the president of the Republic informed.

There is no limit to the number of mandates as prime minister. They are appointed by the president of the Republic, after the legislative elections and after an audience with every leader of a party represented at the Assembly. It is usual for the leader of the party which receives a plurality of votes in the elections to be named prime minister.

The official residence of the prime minister is a mansion next to São Bento Palace, which, in confusion, is also often called "São Bento Palace", although many prime ministers did not live in the palace during their full mandate.

History
The origins of present office of prime minister of Portugal fall back to the beginning of the Portuguese monarchy in the 12th century. Typically, a senior official of the king of Portugal prevailed over the others, ensuring the coordination of the administration of the kingdom as a kind of prime minister. Throughout history, the prominent position fell successively on the Mayor of the Palace (Portuguese Mordomo-Mor), on the Chancellor (Chancellor-Mor), on the King's Private Secretary (Escrivão da Puridade) and on the Secretary of State (Secretário de Estado).

In 1736, three offices of secretary of state were created, with the Secretary of State of the Internal Affairs of the Kingdom (Secretário de Estado dos Negócios Interiores do Reino) occupying a prominent position over the others.

Since the 1820 Liberal Revolution of Porto, liberalism and parliamentarism were installed in the country. In the first liberal period, there were three to six secretaries of state with equal position in the hierarchy, but with the Secretary the Internal Affairs of the Kingdom (usually known by Minister of the Kingdom) continuing to occupy a prominent position. Occasionally there was a Minister Assistant to the Dispatch (Ministro Assistante ao Despacho), a coordinator of all secretaries of state, and with a post similar to that of a prime minister. After a brief absolutistic restoration, the second liberalism started. With the beginning of the Constitutional Monarchy, the office of President of the Council of Ministers (President do Conselho de Ministros) was created. The presidents of the council were clearly the heads of government of the kingdom, holding the executive power that absolute monarchs had, but were restricted by the controlling power of the National Congress.

With the advent of the Republic in the 5 October 1910 revolution, the head of government was renamed President of the Ministry (Presidente do Ministério). During this period the heads of government were under the strong power of the parliament and often fell due to parliamentary turmoils and social instability.

With the 28 May 1926 coup d'état, and eventually, after the formation of the Estado Novo quasi-fascist dictatorial regime of António de Oliveira Salazar, the prime minister was again named President of the Council of Ministers, and was nominally the most important figure in the country. First Salazar and then Marcello Caetano occupied this post for almost 42 years.

With the Carnation Revolution came the prime minister, which replaced the president of the council.

Prime ministers 
The official numbering of the prime ministers starts with the first president of the Council of Ministers of the constitutional monarchy. A second column is added after the establishment of the Republic, numbering the prime ministers from there to the present day. Another column is added for the numbering inside the three regimes: First Republic, the Second Republic and Third Republic, with a fourth column in the Second Republic to mark the numbering of prime ministers since the 1926 revolution that established the National Dictatorship and since the replacement of the National Dictatorship with the Salazarist Estado Novo. In the Third Republic, a fourth column is also used to distinguish the prime ministers of the provisional governments that existed during the period immediately following the Carnation Revolution of 1974 from the prime ministers that assumed office after the entry into force of Portugal's current democratic Constitution adopted 1976.

At the right hand side, a column indicates the official numbering of the Constitutional Governments. The numbering of the Constitutional Governments is not the same as the numbering of prime ministers since the Constitution because, whenever elections for a new parliament take place, a new constitutional government is installed, even if the prime minister remains the same; however, there is also a change of constitutional government when the prime minister is replaced, even if in mid-parliament. So, because some prime ministers managed to remain in office after fresh elections (thus serving as prime ministers under more than one parliament), there are more constitutional governments than there are prime ministers.

The colors indicate the political affiliation of each prime minister.

/independent

Constitutional Monarchy – Second Liberalism (1834–1910)

First Republic (1910–1926)

Second Republic (1926–1974)

Third Republic (1974–present)

Timeline

Prime ministers of Portugal (1834–1910)

Prime ministers of Portugal (1910–1926)

Prime ministers of Portugal (1926–present)

See also

 List of prime ministers of Portugal by time in office
 List of presidents of Portugal
 Politics of Portugal

Notes
 Minority government

References

External links

 WORLD STATESMEN.org (Portugal)
 Prime Ministers since 1910
 Portuguese General Elections since 1820

Portugal, List of Prime Ministers of
 
Prime Ministers
Prime Ministers
Articles which contain graphical timelines